Vampire en pyjama is the eighth studio album by Dionysos, and was released on 29 January 2016, two days after Mathias Malzieu's novel, Journal d'un vampire en pyjama. The album was intended to be more acoustic than those before it and the lyrics are more personal. A mascote accompanies this album : a man with a heart for a head, Heartman, frequently drawn by the band and its fans in the streets of their own towns.

Track listing

The tour 
Dionysos announced the first date and the start of the band's tour on its Facebook page, planned for 3 May 2016 at the Grand Rex. Following this, the band has announced around forty dates across France.

Musicians and instruments

Band 
 Mathias Malzieu: vocals, folk guitar, harmonica
 Michaël Ponton: electric guitar, banjo, xylophone, glockenspiel, programming, dobro guitar, chorus
 Éric Serra-Tosio: drums, whistling, chorus
 Stéphan Bertholio: bass, keyboard, folk guitar, musical saw, chorus
 Élisabet Maistre: vocals, violin, banjo, chorus, programming, keyboards
 Olivier Daviaud: arrangement of horns, chords and chorus, piano, cello, keyboard, chorus, mellotron

Additional Musicians 
 Le Quatuor Akilone 
 Émeline Concé: first violin
 Élise De-Bendelac: second violin
 Louise Desjardin: alto
 Lucie Mercat: cello

 Horns
 Maxime Tomba
 Pierre Badol

Additional programming 
 Matthieu Jay
 Pierrick Devin
 Clément Leveau
 Guest : Rosemary Texeira in Le petit Lion

Features of the album 
 La chanson I Follow Rivers is a cover of a song by Lykke Li. 
 Chanson d'été follows on from the poem by Paul Verlaine, Chanson d'automne. 
 Hospital Blues is sung at the beginning and at the by Mathias Malzieu in head voice.
 The songs are linked to Journal d'un vampire en pyjama by Mathias Malzieu, in a similar way to the links between the band's previous albums and Malzieu's novels.
 Hospital Blues and Chanson d'été were composed at the hospital Mathias Malzieu stayed at.

Charts

Weekly charts

Year-end charts

References 

2016 albums
Dionysos (French band) albums
Columbia Records albums